The 1976 Chicago Cubs season was the 105th season of the Chicago Cubs franchise, the 101st in the National League and the 61st at Wrigley Field. The Cubs finished fourth in the National League East with a record of 75–87.

Offseason 
 October 28, 1975: Don Kessinger was traded by the Cubs to the St. Louis Cardinals for Mike Garman and a player to be named later. The Cardinals completed the deal by sending Bobby Hrapmann (minors) to the Cubs on April 5, 1976.
 December 22, 1975, Vic Harris was traded by the Cubs to the St. Louis Cardinals for Mick Kelleher.

Regular season 
 April 17, 1976: Mike Schmidt of the Philadelphia Phillies hit four consecutive home runs in one game against the Cubs. In the game, the Phillies and Cubs combined for thirty-four runs in a game which featured nine home runs. The Cubs had blown a 13–2 lead at Wrigley, losing to the Phillies 18–16 when Schmidt hit his fourth home run in the 10th inning.
 April 25, 1976: In the fourth inning of a game against the Los Angeles Dodgers at Dodger Stadium, Cubs outfielder Rick Monday noticed two protesters kneeling on the grass in left-center field, with the apparent intention of burning an American flag. He grabbed the flag and brought it to the bullpen. The crowd at Dodger fans started singing "God Bless America" while the fans were escorted out of the stadium. Monday was later presented with the flag in a ceremony at Wrigley Field by Dodgers executive Al Campanis. In the 2000s, the Baseball Hall of Fame recently named Monday's act as one of the 100 Classic Moments in the history of the game.

Season standings

Record vs. opponents

Notable transactions 
 April 19, 1976: Tim Hosley was selected off waivers from the Cubs by the Oakland Athletics.
 April 22, 1976: Tom Dettore was released by the Cubs.
 May 17, 1976: Andre Thornton was traded by the Cubs to the Montreal Expos for Steve Renko and Larry Biittner.
 June 8, 1976: Joe Coleman was purchased by the Cubs from the Detroit Tigers.
 June 8, 1976: Keith Drumright was drafted by the Cubs in the 4th round of the 1976 Major League Baseball draft.
 September 8, 1976: Ramón Hernández was purchased by the Cubs from the Pittsburgh Pirates.

Roster

Player stats

Batting

Starters by position 
Note: Pos = Position; G = Games played; AB = At bats; H = Hits; Avg. = Batting average; HR = Home runs; RBI = Runs batted in

Other batters 
Note: G = Games played; AB = At bats; H = Hits; Avg. = Batting average; HR = Home runs; RBI = Runs batted in

Pitching

Starting pitchers 
Note: G = Games pitched; IP = Innings pitched; W = Wins; L = Losses; ERA = Earned run average; SO = Strikeouts

Other pitchers 
Note: G = Games pitched; IP = Innings pitched; W = Wins; L = Losses; ERA = Earned run average; SO = Strikeouts

Relief pitchers 
Note: G = Games pitched; W = Wins; L = Losses; SV = Saves; ERA = Earned run average; SO = Strikeouts

Farm system

Notes

References 

1976 Chicago Cubs season at Baseball Reference

Chicago Cubs seasons
Chicago Cubs season
Chicago Cubs